Jack Lornie (2 March 1939 – 16 December 2014) was a Scottish footballer who played as an inside forward in the Football League for Leicester City, Luton Town, Carlisle United and Tranmere Rovers. When Lornie finished his career in the English leagues, he moved back to his native Scotland in the summer of 1966 and signed for Dingwall-based, Scottish Highland Football League Club, Ross County FC (Now an established Scottish Premier League Club). Lornie spent circa 10 years at Ross County where he finished as First Team Coach.

References

1939 births
2014 deaths
Footballers from Aberdeen
Association football inside forwards
Scottish footballers
Banks O' Dee F.C. players
Leicester City F.C. players
Luton Town F.C. players
Carlisle United F.C. players
Tranmere Rovers F.C. players
Ross County F.C. players
English Football League players